Stacy Leigh Arthur (née Darland, June 4, 1968 - April 5, 2019) was an American model and actress. Arthur was born in Naperville, Illinois.She was chosen as Playboy's Playmate of the Month for January, 1991.  In addition to her nude pictorial and centerfold in that issue, Arthur was featured on the cover, wearing a pageant-style banner that said "Miss January 1991."  She continued working for Playboy, appearing in numerous Playboy videos.

Arthur was also Mrs. Ohio for the 1990 Mrs. America contest.

Arthur's 36-year-old husband, James Alan Arthur, was the victim of a murder-suicide by a fan named James Lindberg in October 1991. Lindberg shot and killed him on a street in Bellefontaine, Ohio, where the family lived, and then killed himself. The event was the subject of the second episode of the first season of "The Playboy Murders" titled "All That Glitters" that aired January 30, 2023. 

In 1992, Arthur filed a $70 million lawsuit against Playboy and others alleging she was raped and sodomized by three Playboy employees and that inaction by the magazine led to the death of her husband. She claimed two security guards and a butler drugged, then raped and sodomized her on October 6, 1991, at the Playboy Mansion.

Playboy severed its ties with Arthur after she appeared on two nationally televised shows where she publicly declared her rape at the Playboy Mansion. A deputy district attorney opined that there were too many inconsistencies in Arthur's statements while there were no inconsistencies in statements given by the three employees who claimed the sex was consensual. The employees who had engaged in sex with Arthur were fired because they violated company policy by having sex during working hours.

Arthur and her husband, James Arthur, had three children from prior marriages and she died in 2019 after a brief illness.

See also
 List of people in Playboy 1990–1999

References

External links
 
 

1990s Playboy Playmates
1968 births
Living people
Actresses from Naperville, Illinois
21st-century American women